Methylpentanol may refer to:

 2-Methyl-1-pentanol
 3-Methyl-1-pentanol
 4-Methyl-1-pentanol
 2-Methyl-2-pentanol
 3-Methyl-2-pentanol
 4-Methyl-2-pentanol
 2-Methyl-3-pentanol
 3-Methyl-3-pentanol